Thaddeus John Kwalick (born April 15, 1947) is an American former professional football player who was a tight end in the National Football League (NFL) and World Football League (WFL). He played for the San Francisco 49ers from 1969-1974 and the Oakland Raiders from 1975-1977. In 1975, he also played with the Philadelphia Bell of the World Football League.

Early years
Kwalick attended Penn State University after growing up and playing high school football at Montour High School outside Pittsburgh.

He made several All-America teams in 1967, and was unanimous in 1968, becoming Penn State's first two-time All-America. His career totals, 1343 yards and 10 touchdowns, were Penn State records for a tight end. He was inducted into the College Football Hall of Fame in 1989 and National Polish-American Sports Hall of Fame in 2005.

Professional career
Kwalick was selected by the San Francisco 49ers in the first round (seventh overall) of the 1969 NFL Draft. scored the first touchdown in Candlestick Park in 1971. In March 1974, he was selected by The Hawaiians in the first round (11th overall) of the WFL Pro Draft.

Personal life
Kwalick earned a BS in Physical Education from Penn State University in 1969. He is the president/owner of ProTech Voltage Systems, Inc., in Santa Clara, California.

External links
Kwalick takes in game from another perspective, Centre Daily Times, August 3, 2008

1947 births
Living people
All-American college football players
American football tight ends
Players of American football from Pennsylvania
Penn State Nittany Lions football players
San Francisco 49ers players
Sportspeople from the Pittsburgh metropolitan area
National Conference Pro Bowl players
Philadelphia Bell players
Oakland Raiders players
College Football Hall of Fame inductees
People from McKees Rocks, Pennsylvania
American people of Polish descent